Aisa or AISA may refer to:
 Aisa (fate), the Homeric Moira or Atropos, one of the three Fates
 Aisa (portion), an Homeric word similar with Moira (part or portion)
 Aísa, a town in Spain
 Aesa, a town of ancient Macedonia
 Aisa (leafhopper), a leafhopper genus in the tribe Erythroneurini
 Aeronáutica Industrial S.A., a Spanish aeronautical company
 Afghanistan Investment Support Agency
 Alabama Independent School Association, which was created to support segregation academies in Alabama 
 All India Students Association
 American International School, Abu Dhabi
 American International School of Abuja
 American International School of Algiers